Fuet (lit. "whip") is a Catalan thin, dry-cured, sausage of pork meat in a pork gut. The most famous is made in the comarca (county) of Osona and is also known as Vic fuet (fuet de Vic, after the city of Vic, capital of Osona).  Other places that have long tradition of making it are the city of Olot and the surrounding areas.

Fuet is a long, thin shape measuring between 30 and 50 cm long and up to 4 cm in diameter, with a usual weight between 150 and 300 g. It is made of about 60% lean meat to 40% finely minced fat and is dry-cured.

Flavour 
Fuet is flavored with black pepper and garlic, and sometimes aniseed, but unlike chorizo contains no paprika.

History 
In Europe, natural fermented sausages have a long tradition originating in Mediterranean countries during Roman times. In the Roman documentation there is evidence that the Iberians already made sausages with names still in use today. There are several Roman documents that praise the Cerdanya hams made by the Iberians as some of the best in the world. The importance of sausages in European culture led to the establishment of routes to obtain the ingredients to prepare sausages, such as the "Via Salaria" salt route in Italy.

Gallery

See also
List of sausages

References

External links 

 Fuet info at spanishclub.blog

Spanish sausages
Catalan cuisine
Fermented sausages